Đoàn Việt Cường (born January 1, 1985 in Đồng Tháp) is a Vietnamese footballer who currently plays for Xuân Thành Sài Gòn in V-League and is,a member of the Vietnam national football team. His father Đoàn Văn Phát was a player in Đồng Tháp just as Viet Cuong was also once before 2009.

In Dong Thap, he plays as a right side defender, though he started out as a left side defender. When missing people, he can still play as center defender pretty well. He once got to be the captain of Đồng Tháp F.C. when he was younger.

References

External links

1985 births
Living people
People from Đồng Tháp Province
Vietnamese footballers
Association football defenders
Xuan Thanh Saigon Cement FC players
Navibank Sài Gòn FC players
Dong Thap FC players
Vietnam international footballers